Yñiguez is a Spanish surname. Notable people with the surname include:
Nicanor Yñiguez (1915-2007), Filipino politician
Pepe Yñiguez, Spanish baseball broadcaster
Richard Yniguez (born 1946), American actor

Spanish-language surnames